Rudolf Medek (8 January 1890 in Hradec Králové – 22 August 1940) was a Czech poet, army-related prose writer, and a general in the Czechoslovak Legions in Russia. In 1919 he was awarded the Distinguished Service Order by George V which he sent back after the Munich Agreement, as he did with his Légion d'honneur insignia.

He was the father of the musician and journalist Ivan Medek, and the painter Mikuláš Medek.

Partial bibliography
 Rokoko - poem
 Půlnoc bohů (English: Midnight of Gods) (1912) - book of poetry
 Anabáze - army document
 Plukovník Švec - army drama

References

External links
 
 gen. Rudolf Medek - article on valka.cz 

1890 births
1940 deaths
Czech poets
Czech male poets
Czechoslovak Legions in literature
Writers from Hradec Králové
Knights of the Order of the Falcon (Czechoslovakia)
Companions of the Distinguished Service Order
Recipients of the Legion of Honour
20th-century Czech poets
20th-century male writers